Matthew Heyden "Matt" Smith (born September 19, 1972 in Bethel Park, Pennsylvania) is an American politician. He served as a member of the Pennsylvania State Senate, representing the 37th district from January 2013 until June 2015. A member of the Democratic Party, he also served in the Pennsylvania House of Representatives from 2007 to 2012. He was elected to the State Senate in the 2012 election.

Biography
Smith is the son of James and Janice Smith who also were born and raised in the Mount Lebanon, Pennsylvania.  Smith is a graduate of Rollins College at Winter Park, Florida with a degree in history.  He graduated from the Duquesne University School of Law with honors in 1999. He lives in Mount Lebanon, Pennsylvania with his wife, Eileen Smith. Prior to elective office, Smith worked for Babst, Calland, Clements and Zomnir, P.C.

Smith was elected to the Pennsylvania House of Representatives in 2006, defeating 21-year-old Republican Mark Harris, who had defeated incumbent Tom Stevenson in the Republican primary.

Smith was elected to the Pennsylvania State Senate in 2012, defeating Republican opponent Dakshinamurthy "D." Raja.  Raja spent $5 million on his campaign, while Smith spent only $1 million.

Pennsylvania Senate minority leader Jay Costa announced in May 2015 that Smith would be stepping down from the Senate, effective in June 2015, to become President of the Greater Pittsburgh Chamber of Commerce.

Electoral history

References

External links

Democratic Party members of the Pennsylvania House of Representatives
Duquesne University School of Law alumni
People from Bethel Park, Pennsylvania
People from Mt. Lebanon, Pennsylvania
Living people
1972 births
Rollins College alumni